The 2014 Team Speedway Junior European Championship was the seventh Team Speedway Junior European Championship season. It was organised by the Fédération Internationale de Motocyclisme and was the third as an under 21 years of age event.

The final took place on 28 June 2014 in Herxheim, Germany. The defending champions Poland won the final easily with 49 points to seal three consecutive titles.

Results

Final
  Herxheim
 28 June 2014

See also 
 2014 Team Speedway Junior World Championship
 2014 Individual Speedway Junior European Championship

References 

2014
European Team Junior